Paraeutrichopus is a genus of ground beetles in the family Carabidae. There are at least two described species in Paraeutrichopus, found in the Canary Islands.

Species
These two species belong to the genus Paraeutrichopus:
 Paraeutrichopus harpaloides (Wollaston, 1864)
 Paraeutrichopus pecoudi Mateu, 1954

References

Platyninae